The Battle of Sadras was the first of five largely indecisive naval battles fought between a British fleet (under Admiral Sir Edward Hughes) and a French fleet (under Admiral Pierre Suffren) off the east coast of India during the Anglo-French War. Fought on 17 February 1782 near present-day Kalpakkam, the battle was tactically indecisive, but the British fleet suffered the most damage. Under Suffren's protection, French troop transports were able to land at Porto Novo, present-day Parangipettai.

Background
France had entered the American Revolutionary War in 1778, and Britain had declared war on the Dutch Republic in late 1780 after the Dutch refused to stop trading with the French and the Americans. The British had rapidly gained control over most French and Dutch outposts in India when news of these events reached India, spawning the Second Anglo-Mysore War in the process.

The French admiral Bailli de Suffren was dispatched for military assistance to French colonies in India, leading a fleet of five ships of the line, seven transports, and a corvette to escort transports from Brest in March 1781. Suffren was involved in a happenstance battle with a British fleet at Porto Praya in the Cape Verde Islands in April. In October, he left reinforcement troops at the Dutch-controlled Cape of Good Hope to assist with colonial defense. Suffren added some ships to his fleet and sailed on to the Île de France (present-day Mauritius), arriving at Port Louis in December.

After further additions at Port Louis, Suffren's fleet sailed for India under the command of the elderly Navy Brigadier General Thomas d'Orves, accompanying transports carrying nearly 3,000 men under the command of the Comte du Chemin. D'Orves died in February 1782, shortly before the fleet arrived off the Indian coast, and Suffren once again took command.

Suffren first sailed for Madras, hoping to surprise the British stronghold there. Encountering Hughes's fleet anchored in Madras on 15 February 1782, Suffren turned south. He intended to land troops at Porto Novo, march up the coast and recapture French and Dutch holdings on the way. Hughes raised anchor and sailed after Suffren.

Battle

Suffren was hampered with protecting his troop convoys from Hughes, whose goal he presumed was to prevent the troops from landing. Detaching one corvette to protect the convoy and detailing another to watch the British fleet, Suffren attempted to draw Hughes away.  However, under cover of night Hughes managed to slip between Suffren's squadron and the convoys. The signal was raised on the morning of 17 February, and Suffren gave chase to force battle.

When the fleets closed for action around 15:30, some of Suffren's ships had not properly formed the line of battle. Only five of the French ships engaged at first. Of the remaining six, only two joined the action later, with the other four apparently violating Suffren's orders and hanging back.  Suffren, leading in Héros, exchanged a broadside with Exeter before targeting Hughes's flagship Superb. The battle lasted for over three hours, with Exeter sustaining the most damage. She was nearly sunk, but two French ships were recalled (for reasons unknown) before they could inflict enough damage to cause her to sink. Superb also suffered significant damage. The battle came to end with the onset of night.

Aftermath
Suffren summoned his captains for council and chastised those who had chosen to stay out of the battle before following the troop convoy to Porto Novo. There the French army had landed, and Suffren met with the Mysorean ruler Hyder Ali to plan strategy. After making repairs, Suffren set off to find Hughes again. The French and Mysorean forces captured Cuddalore, just north of Porto Novo, on 4 April. Hughes sailed for Trincomalee, where he made repairs.

Order of battle

Sources and references 
 Notes

References

 Bibliography
 
 
 
 Killion, Howard R (1972), The Suffren Expedition: French Operations in India during the War of American Independence [Duke U. Ph.D. dissertation]
 

External links
 A photo blog on Sadras

Naval battles of the East Indies Campaign
Conflicts in 1782
Naval battles involving Great Britain
Naval battles involving France
1782 in Asia
Naval battles of the American Revolutionary War